Gilbert Blue (December 5, 1933 – June 11, 2016) was a Native American chief of the Catawba Nation in the U.S. state of South Carolina from 1973 until 2007. He was a grandson of chief Samuel Taylor Blue. Blue was a  member of the Church of Jesus Christ of Latter-day Saints. During his time as chief, the Catawba received federal recognition.

Personal life 
Blue died on June 11, 2016, of mesothelioma.

References

External links
article on Catawba's quest for a casino
Indianz interview with Blue

1933 births
2016 deaths
Catawba people
Native American leaders
Native American people from South Carolina
Latter Day Saints from South Carolina
Deaths from mesothelioma
20th-century Native Americans
21st-century Native Americans